Miss World 1970, the 20th Anniversary of the Miss World pageant, was held on 20 November 1970 at the Royal Albert Hall in London, UK. 58 contestants competed for the Miss World title. Jennifer Hosten from Grenada won the crown of Miss World 1970. Although Miss World 1969, Eva Rueber-Staier of Austria, was present and took part in a dance routine before the announcement of the winner, the new Miss World was crowned by Bob Hope. The event was marked by controversy in the days beforehand, during the contest itself and afterwards.

Results

Placement

Continental Queens of Beauty

Contestants

   – Pearl Gladys Jansen
  – Patricia María Charré Salazar
  – Valli Kemp
  – Rosemarie Resch
  – June Justina Brown
  – Francine Martin
  – Sonia Yara Guerra
  – Norma Joyce Hickey
  – Yolanda Shahzali Ahlip
  – Carmelina Bayona Vera
  – Louiza Anastadiades
  – Winnie Hollman
  – Fátima Shecker
  – Sofía Virginia Monteverde Nimbriotis 
  – Hannele Hamara
  – Micheline Beaurain
  – Margaret Davies
  – Dagmar Eva Ruthenberg
  – Carmen Gomez
  – Julie Vardi
  – Jennifer Hosten
  – Jennifer Diana Evan Wong
  – Patricia Hollman
  – Ann Lay
  – Anna Hansdóttir
  – Heather Corinne Faville
  – Mary Elizabeth McKinley
  – Irith Lavi
  – Marika de Poi
  – Elizabeth Ann Lindo
  – Hisayo Nakamura
  – Lee Jung-hee
  – Georgina Rizk
  – Mainusa Wiles
  – Rita Massard
  – Mary Ann Wong
  – Tessa Marthese Galea
  – Florence Muller
  – Libia Zulema López Montemayor
  – Glenys Elizabeth Treweek
  – Evangelina Lacayo
  – Stella Owivri †
  – Aud Fosse
  – Minerva Manalo Cagatao
  – Ana Maria Diozo Lucas
  – Alma Doris Pérez
  – Nicole Barallon
  – Jillian Elizabeth Jessup
  – Josefina Román Gutiérrez
  – Marjorie Christel Johansson 
  – Sylvia Christina Weisser
  – Tuanjai Amnakamart
  – Kaltoum Khouildi
  – Afet Tugbay
  – Yvonne Anne Ormes
  – Sandra Anne Wolsfeld
  – Tomasa Nina de las Casas Mata
  – Tereza Đelmiš

Judges
A panel of nine judges evaluated the performance of the contestants in Miss World 1970. Judges included Joan Collins, Roesmin Nurjadin (the Indonesian Ambassador), Eric Gairy (the first Prime Minister of Grenada), Glen Campbell and Nina.

Notes

Debuts

Returns

Last competed in 1959:
 
 
Last competed in 1964:
 
 
Last competed in 1966:
 
Last competed in 1968:

Other Notes
  - Georgina Rizk went on to compete in Miss Universe in 1971, which was held in Miami Beach, and win the crown.

Protests and controversy
There was controversy before the contest began because the organisers had allowed two entries from South Africa, one black, one white. On the evening of the contest, a bomb exploded under a BBC outside broadcast van in an unsuccessful attempt by the Angry Brigade to prevent the contest being televised. There were no injuries. The audience then had to enter the hall past noisy demonstrators who were penned behind barricades.

During the evening there were protests by Women's Liberation activists. They threw flour bombs during the event, momentarily alarming the host, Bob Hope. He was also heckled during the proceedings. The protests are the subject of the film Misbehaviour which was released in 2020.

Even greater controversy then followed after the result was announced. Jennifer Hosten, Miss Grenada, won, becoming the first Black woman to win Miss World, and the Black contestant from South Africa placed second. The BBC and newspapers received numerous protests about the result. Four of the nine judges had given first-place votes to Miss Sweden, while Miss Grenada received only two firsts, yet the Swedish entrant finished fourth. Furthermore, the Prime Minister of Grenada, Sir Eric Gairy, was on the judging panel. One of Gairy's obituaries described his corruption and use of a gang of thugs when in government. There were many accusations that the contest had been rigged, with counter-accusations that scrutiny of the results was motivated by racism and pointed that favouritism of white contestants had been typical in the contest's history. Some of the audience gathered in the street outside Royal Albert Hall after the contest and chanted "Swe-den, Swe-den". Four days later the organising director, Julia Morley, resigned because of the intense pressure from the newspapers. Years later Miss Sweden, Maj Christel Johansson, was reported as saying that she felt she had been cheated out of the title.

Morley's husband, Eric Morley, was the chairman of the company (Mecca) that owned the Miss World franchise. To disprove the accusations, Eric Morley put the judging panel's ballot cards on view and described the complex "majority vote system". These cards showed that Jennifer Hosten had more place markings in the 2nd, 3rd, 4th and 5th positions over Miss Sweden and the other five finalists. Julia Morley then resumed her job. However, many observers still felt Sir Eric Gairy on the judging panel had influenced the other judges to give Ms Hosten token placings.

In popular culture
In 2014, BBC Radio produced an audio documentary as an episode of its The Reunion series, bringing together Jennifer Hosten, host of the competition Michael Aspel and several of the women who had disrupted and protested against the show. This documentary inspired Philippa Lowthorpe to produce and direct the 2020 movie Misbehaviour which dramatized the events surrounding the contest. Shortly after its release, BBC television produced a further documentary Beauty Queens and Bedlam which interviewed the protestors, organizers, hosts and Misses Grenada, Africa South and Sweden.

References

External links
 Pageantopolis – Miss World 1970
 1970 Miss World Part 1
 1970 Miss World Part 2
 Sally Alexander, one of the feminists who disrupted the 1970 Miss World contest, talking about the protest

 
Miss World
1970 in London
1970 beauty pageants
Beauty pageants in the United Kingdom
Events at the Royal Albert Hall
November 1970 events in the United Kingdom
Feminist protests
Feminism in the United Kingdom
Boycotts of apartheid South Africa